Crvena jabuka is a pop rock band formed in Sarajevo, SR Bosnia and Herzegovina in 1985. Since then they had great success and are still very popular. They were a part of the New primitives movement that started during the 80s.

Biography

The 80s
Crvena jabuka was founded in 1985. The first line-up of the band consisted of drummer Darko Jelčić, lead guitarist/singer Dražen Ričl "Zijo", bassist Aljoša Buha, rhythm guitarist/lead songwriter  "Zlaja", and keyboardist/vocalist Dražen Žerić "Žera."  The band's name was derived from an occasion when Darko Jelčić brought a red apple to one of the band's meetings. Although Tomislav Ćorković was offered an initial space for guitar, he did not accept at the time and never played with the band. They released their self titled debut album in 1986, and it was an instant success. The album contained singles such as "Bježi kišo s prozora", "S tvojih usana", and "Dirlija". The band quickly gained popularity all over former SFR Yugoslavia, and on September 18, 1986 the band headed to Mostar for a promotional concert, and suffered a car accident that claimed the lives of two members. - Dražen Ričl and Aljoša Buha.

In tribute of this tragic moment, a concert was done in Skenderija palace in Sarajevo in which musicians and bands from all generations performed. Crvena jabuka would end with their work.

Because the material for 1987's "Za sve ove godine" was ready, the band decided to first record that before undergoing a one-year hiatus. The band decided to stay a trio with Dražen Žerić (who originally sang backup vocals) taking on lead vocal duties. Guitarist Zlatko Arslanagić also switched to mostly lead/bass guitar, and Darko Jelcic decided to remain on drums. Next to him, Zeric was the only original member present in the band. Also, as the 1987 album was meant to be a tribute to Dražen Ričl and Aljoša Buha, there were no promo ads. Nor was there a tour because of the requests of the band members.

It was, however, 1988's Sanjati that proved the band's commercial success. While the album was recorded in the same fashion as Za sve ove godine, the band brought in two more musicians, bassist Srđan Serberdžija, and keyboardist Zlatko Volarević. This allowed Zera to focus primarily on vocals, and Zlaja to go to just lead guitar. The album sold 250,000 copies, and following its release, Crvena Jabuka embarked on a 180 concert tour.

The band made some major changes during the recording of Sanjati. First, the band worked in Rockoko studios in Zagreb. They would record every future album there. Secondly, the band dropped producer Željko Brodarić (who had produced their first two albums), and got Niksa Bratos. (Niksa would eventually be inducted as another full-time member, and the third long-standing member next to Jelcic and Zeric.) Not only was Bratos a producer, but a multi-instrumentalist. He could put all the band's ideas to work, and even did string arrangements. He would be put on rhythm guitar, and would also play many woodwind instruments on future albums.

January 1989 was when the recording contract for the band's fourth album called Tamo gdje ljubav počinje was signed. Serberdia, having grown tired of touring with the band, quit right after the first session so was replaced by professional guitarist/bassist Branko Salka. Immediately after this release, a tour took place. During the tour Niksa Bratos was not available, but suggested a good friend of his, Igor Ivanovic. The significant moment was at the Sports Arena in Zagreb where a double album was recorded live called "Uzmi me (kad hoćeš ti)".

The 90s
In 1991, the band released their fifth studio album. This album was titled Nekako s proljeća, and had the singles "Moje najmilije", "Da nije ljubavi", and the title cut which has Kemal Monteno as a guest. This would be the first time that Jabuka has collaborated with another singer. For this album, Niksa Bratos was once again replaced. This time, by former bassist Srdan Serberdia's father, Zoran Serberdia.

A tour was meant to happen, but it was never done due to the wars in Croatia and Bosnia and Herzegovina. After this album, Zlatko Arslanagić left the band and eventually moved to Toronto. Žera opened his new cafe in Sarajevo called "Broj jedan" (Number one). Even the remaining members parted ways. Niksa moved to Zagreb (and so would the rest of the band eventually), Igor Ivanovic to Germany, and Zoran Serberdia to Macedonia. Furthermore, Croatia Records released, in 1993, an 18-hit compilation entitled Ima nesto od srca do srca. The album was put into chronological order, but for unknown reasons, omitted both "Bježi kišo s prozora", and a cover of Bacila je sve niz rijeku (a hit for Indexi in 1974). This album would, in 2005, be re-released but dubbed Zlatna Kolekcija. It would include the two said songs that were previously omitted, and also be in chronological order with 20 songs more than this one.

In the fall of 1994, Cunja, and Zera both relocated to Zagreb to re-unite with Niksa Bratos who now was to play on every album, and attend most shows. A backing vocals trio of Darija Hodnik, Jana Nemacek, and Mirza Treterac was established to the band, and so were three more members: guitarist Mario Vukcevic-Jimmy, bassist Kresmir Kastelan "Kreso" (4th long-standing member), and keyboard player Danijel Lastric. There was a big tour once again covering: Macedonia, the Czech Republic, Austria, Germany, and Armenia, and of course, the former Yugoslavia countries.

With this new lineup, the band released their next album in 1996 called U tvojim očima. This album featured two guests as well as various authors of songs including Saša Lošić of Plavi orkestar. Immediately a tour went of all over including: Zagreb, Tuzla, Mostar, and Sarajevo.

In 1998, yet another studio album was released titled Svijet je lopta šarena. This was another best selling album of the band. In that same year they recorded their next live album simply called "LIVE", and in 1999, Crvena jabuka released an unplugged album called Riznice sjećanja.

2000 to Present Day
In 2000, the band went on a new chapter with their next studio album entitled Sve što sanjam.

In 2002, Crvena jabuka returned with Tvojim željama vođen. After releasing this album, guitarist Zlatko Bebek, and keyboard player Danijel Lastrić left the band. The replacements were Marko Bjelić on keyboards, and Damir Gönz on guitar.

In 2005, Žera reformed the band. The result was Oprosti što je ljubavna.  

2005 also saw the release of an updated hit singles collection that the band called Zlatna kolekcija. It contained hits from 1986 to 2002.

In 2007, Crvena jabuka announced yet another album called Duša Sarajeva. The album has 11 new songs.

During the time of 2007-2008 the band was mostly doing concerts touring Canada and USA.

Singer Dražen Žerić-Žera got married on October 5, 2008; which is the reason for the band's album entitled Volim te, which has songs more in the style of the old Crvena Jabuka rather than what they've showed in Oprosti što je ljubavna and Duša Sarajeva .

The band released an album in 2011 entitled "Za tvoju ljubav".

In mid 2013, the band released an album entitled "Nek' bude ljubav".

Discography

Studio albums
 Crvena Jabuka (Red Apple) March 22, 1986
 Za sve ove godine (For All These Years), 1987
 Sanjati (To Dream) June 6, 1988
 Tamo gdje ljubav počinje (Where Love Begins), January, 1989
 Nekako s proljeća (In Springtime), 1991
 U tvojim očima (In Your Eyes) January 17, 1996
 Svijet je lopta šarena (The World is a Colourful Ball), December 1997
 Sve što sanjam (Everything I Dream), July 2000
 Tvojim željama vođen (Led By Your Wishes), December 2002
 Oprosti što je ljubavna pjesma (Forgive Me for This Love Song), July 2005
 Duša Sarajeva (The Soul of Sarajevo), 2007
 Volim te (I Love You), February 2009
 Za tvoju ljubav (For Your Love), 2011
 Nek' bude ljubav (Let There Be Love), 2013
 2016 (2016), 2016
 Nocturno (Nocturno), 2018
 Tvrđava (Fortress), 2020
 Neka nova jutra (Some New Mornings), 2022

Live albums
 Uzmi me (kad hoćeš ti) Take me (When You Want To) 1990
 LIVE 1998
 Riznice sjećanja-unplugged 1999
 Bivše Djevojčice Bivši Dječaci- unplugged live u Lisinskom 2014

Compilations
 Ima nešto od srca do srca (There Is Something from Heart to Heart) 1993
 Moje najmilije (My Dearest) 1996
 Antologija (Anthology) 2003
 Zlatna kolekcija (The Golden Collection) 2005
 Da Nije Ljubavi - 25 Godina'' (If there's no love) 2010

Band members

Lineups

See also 
 Sarajevo school of pop rock
 New Primitives

References

Sources

External links 
MP3 source
Crvena jabuka discography
Crvena Jabuka song lyrics

Bosnia and Herzegovina musical groups
Croatian musical groups
Yugoslav rock music groups
Croatian rock music groups
Musical groups established in 1985
1985 establishments in Yugoslavia